Events in the year 1882 in Brazil.

Incumbents
Monarch – Pedro II
Prime Minister – José Antônio Saraiva (until 21 January), Martinho Álvares da Silva Campos (from 21 January to 3 July), Marquis of Paranaguá (starting July 3)

Events

Births
 19 April - Getúlio Vargas

Deaths

References

 
1880s in Brazil
Years of the 19th century in Brazil
Brazil
Brazil